The following lists events that happened during 2000 in Finland.

Incumbents
 President: Martti Ahtisaari (until 1 March), Tarja Halonen (starting 1 March)
 Prime Minister: Paavo Lipponen

Events

Births

 July 6 – Jesperi Kotkaniemi, ice hockey player
 December 26 – Isac Elliot, actor, dancer, singer and songwriter

Deaths

References

 
2000s in Finland
Finland
Finland
Years of the 20th century in Finland